The 2BB2 400 class were two electric locomotives built in 1926 for the Paris Orléans (PO) railway of France.

After wartime coal shortages during World War I, post-war reconstruction from 1919 focussed on electrification, powered by hydro electricity. In 1923 the PO began electrification of the 200 km section of the Toulouse main line from Paris to Vierzon using a supply of 1,500 V DC. The Ganz Works of Budapest, Hungary supplied these two locomotives, to the design of Kálmán Kandó.

The arrangement of the locomotives was unusual for DC locomotives and may have been influenced by Kandó's other designs for AC locomotives, with the large diameter frame-mounted AC motors of the period. The four motors were mounted rigidly on the frames, above the driving wheels. Each motor drove an external jackshaft crank, with the four driving axles coupled in pairs. Drive between the motor jackshafts and the wheels was by coupling rods.  As express passenger locomotives, this also permitted large diameter driving wheels, rather than small-wheeled bogies beneath the frames. Suspension travel between the driven wheels and the fixed motors was achieved through Kandó's triangular linkage design.

The coupled wheels, rather than individual traction motors, encouraged resistance to wheelslip. This advantage was recognised and influenced future French designs, such as the typically French monomotor bogie rather than the axle-hung traction motors used elsewhere.

In service, the locomotives proved fast and powerful, but were unreliable. Despite this they were popular with their crews, encouraged by the French practice of attaching crews to the same locomotive. They gained the class nickname, Les Belles Hongroisses. Their later years were spent in freight-only service based at Limoges. They survived into SNCF service until 1938, keeping their original numbers, but were withdrawn and scrapped that year.

Notes

References 

E.0401
2-B-B-2 locomotives
Railway locomotives introduced in 1926
Standard gauge electric locomotives of France
1500 V DC locomotives
Passenger locomotives
Scrapped locomotives